Harry Kavanagh was an Australian rugby league footballer who played in the 1920s.  He played for Eastern Suburbs in the NSWRL competition.

Playing career
Kavanagh made his first grade debut for Eastern Suburbs in Round 10 1925 against Balmain at the Sydney Sports Ground.  Eastern Suburbs would go on to finish second last in 1925 only 2 years after winning the premiership in 1923.  The club only avoided the wooden spoon on for and against.

In 1928, Kavanagh was part of the Easts side which claimed the minor premiership and reached the grand final against Souths who were looking for their 4th premiership in a row.  Kavanagh played at second-row as Easts were comprehensively beaten 26–5 in the final which was played at the Royal Agricultural Society Grounds in front of 25,000 people.

Kavanagh played on in 1929 before retiring at the end of the season.

References

Sydney Roosters players
Rugby league players from Sydney
City New South Wales rugby league team players
Rugby league props
Rugby league locks
Rugby league second-rows
Year of birth missing
Year of death missing
Place of birth missing
Place of death missing